Charles F. Wagaman Jr. (born February 20, 1942) is an American politician. He was a member of the Maryland House of Delegates, representing District 3A from 1979 to 1986.

Early life
Charles F. Wagaman Jr. was born on February 20, 1942, in Hagerstown, Maryland. He attended public schools in Hagerstown and The Hill School in Pottstown, Pennsylvania. Wagaman graduated with a Bachelor of Science from Tufts University in 1965 and a Bachelor of Laws degree from University of Maryland School of Law in 1968. He was admitted to the bar in Maryland in 1968.

Career
Wagaman served as a member of the Maryland House of Delegates, representing Washington County, Maryland from 1971 to 1974. He then represented District 3A from 1975 to 1978. He was elected as a Republican.

Personal life
Wagaman is married.

References

Living people
1942 births
Politicians from Hagerstown, Maryland
Tufts University alumni
University of Maryland Francis King Carey School of Law alumni
Republican Party members of the Maryland House of Delegates
20th-century American politicians